Scalawag is a nickname for Southern whites who supported Reconstruction after the American Civil War.

Scalawag may also refer to:

 Scalawag (film), a 1973 film directed by Kirk Douglas
 Scalawags, a podcast about the Scala programming language
 Scalawag (magazine), an American nonprofit magazine focused on Southern politics and culture

See also
Scallywag (disambiguation)